WINM (channel 12) is a religious television station licensed to Angola, Indiana, United States, serving the Fort Wayne area as owned-and-operated station of Tri-State Christian Television (TCT). The station's transmitter is located in unincorporated Williams County, Ohio (in the Toledo market), near the Indiana state line, midway between Butler, Indiana, and Edgerton, Ohio. Though most of the city proper is adequately covered by the main signal, WINM's signal is relayed in Fort Wayne on digital translator WEIJ-LD (channel 38).

WINM maintained studios on Butler Road in Fort Wayne (in the former studio facility of PBS member station WFWA, channel 39) until TCT ended local operations in June 2018. Despite Angola being WINM's city of license, the station maintains no physical presence there.

History
The station first signed on the air as WXJC-TV on April 22, 1983, originally affiliated with the Trinity Broadcasting Network. In 1984, the station's call sign was changed to WBKZ; it was changed again to WINM in 1986, when the station was purchased by Manna for Modern Man Ministries. Quad M Productions, as it was called, was fully owned by Calvary Temple Worship Center and solely run by the family of Paul Paino. The studio facilities were located in the old Calvary Temple location on Clinton Street in Fort Wayne. After encountering financial problems, the station filed for bankruptcy and shut down. The license was purchased in 1991 by TCT, who began producing their own part-time network feed of religious programming, and began airing it on their owned-and-operated stations. TCT fully disassociated with TBN in April 2007.

On February 27, 2004, the call letters of WINM's Fort Wayne translator, previously W66BD, were changed to W43CF and correspondingly, was moved to UHF channel 43. The repeater later moved to digital channel 38 and had its callsign changed to W38EA-D (now WEIJ-LD).

Technical information

Subchannels
The station's digital signal is multiplexed:

Analog-to-digital conversion
WINM shut down its analog signal, over UHF channel 63, on June 12, 2009, the official date in which full-power television stations in the United States transitioned from analog to digital broadcasts under federal mandate. The station's digital signal remained on its pre-transition VHF channel 12. Through the use of PSIP, digital television receivers originally displayed the station's virtual channel as its former UHF analog channel 63, which was among the high band UHF channels (52-69) that were removed from broadcasting use as a result of the transition, but remapped it to virtual channel 12 in 2011.

References

External links
Tri-State Christian TV

Steuben County, Indiana
Television channels and stations established in 1983
INM
1983 establishments in Indiana
Tri-State Christian Television affiliates
Cozi TV affiliates
Defy TV affiliates
TrueReal affiliates